A monarch is a ruler in a system (monarchy) where succession is hereditary.

Monarch or Monarchy may also refer to:

Biology
Danaus (genus), a genus of butterflies commonly called monarchs
Monarch flycatcher or Monarchidae, a family of passerine birds

Places
Monarch, Alberta, Canada
Monarch, Colorado, United States
Monarch, Montana, an American unincorporated community
Monarch, Virginia, United States
Monarch, West Virginia, United States
Monarch, Wyoming, an American unincorporated community
Monarch Icefield, a large continental icecap in British Columbia, Canada
Monarch Lake, a reservoir in Colorado, United States
Monarch Mountain, a summit of the Pacific Ranges in British Columbia, Canada
Monarch Mountain (Alberta), a peak in the Victoria Cross Ranges in Canada
Monarch Pass, Colorado, United States
Monarch Ski Area, Colorado, United States
The Monarch (Canadian Rockies), a mountain in Canada

Entertainment
Monarch (film), a 2000 British costume drama involving Henry VIII
Monarchy (TV series), a documentary television series about the British monarchy
Monarch (American TV series), an American TV series
Lord Monarch, a 1991 strategy war video game
Monarch: The Butterfly King, a 2007 personal computer game
Monarch, a fictional organization in the MonsterVerse film franchise
HMS Monarch, a fictional Royal Navy warship from the 2017 film Pirates of the Caribbean: Dead Men Tell No Tales

Comics and animation
Monarch (comics), a DC Comics supervillain
The Monarch, a butterfly-themed villain on the animated television series The Venture Bros.
The Monarchy (comics), a Wildstorm comic
Monarch: The Big Bear of Tallac, an anime television series

Music
Monarch (band), French drone doom band
Monarch (American band), a Los Angeles indie electro-pop band
Monarchy (band), English synthpop duo
Michael Monarch (born 1950), American guitarist
The Monarch (production team), an American music production duo
Monarch (Lay Your Jewelled Head Down), a 1999 album by Canadian singer Feist
I, Monarch, 2005 album by Hate Eternal
"Monarch" (Delerium song), 2012, featuring Nadina

Ships
, several ships in the British Royal Navy

MS Monarch (formerly Monarch of the Seas), a 1990 cruise ship
Monarch-class coastal defense ships of the Austro-Hungarian Navy
, the lead ship of the class
Ersatz Monarch-class battleships, cancelled replacement class
CS Monarch, any of several cable-laying ships

Sports
Carolina Monarchs, a 1995–1997 Greensboro ice hockey team in the American Hockey League
Dresden Monarchs, an American football club from Dresden, Germany
Edinburgh Monarchs, a speedway team in Scotland
Greensboro Monarchs, a 1989–1995 Carolina ice hockey team in the East Coast Hockey League
Kansas City Monarchs, a former professional baseball team in Missouri, United States
London Monarchs,  a UK American football team in NFL Europe
Manchester Monarchs (AHL), a 2001–2015 ice hockey team in New Hampshire, United States
Manchester Monarchs (ECHL), a 2015–2019 ice hockey team in New Hampshire, United States
Melbourne Monarchs, a team in the Australian Baseball League
Mimico Monarchs, a junior ice hockey team in Ontario, Canada
Sacramento Monarchs, a former professional basketball team in California, United States
Winnipeg Monarchs (disambiguation), various ice hockey teams from Winnipeg, Manitoba, Canada
"Monarchs", the nickname for the athletic teams from Old Dominion University in Virginia, United States
Monarch Stadium (Methodist), a college football stadium in Fayetteville, North Carolina

Vehicles
Monarch (automobile), a car built in Detroit, Michigan from 1913 to 1917
Monarch (locomotive), a British articulated locomotive
Monarch (marque), a Ford of Canada brand name
Monarch (sternwheeler), an American steamboat
Marske Monarch, a glider
Mercury Monarch, a midsize American sedan built from 1975 to 1980
MIT Monarch B, a human-powered aircraft
Miles Monarch, a British light aeroplane of the 1930s
The Butterfly Monarch, an American autogyro design

Other uses
Monarch (range), a brand for home appliances from the Malleable Iron Range Company
Monarch (software), data capture and extraction software
Monarch Airlines (1946–1950), an American airline
Monarch Airlines (1967–2017), a British airline
Monarch Beverage Company, a drink bottler in Atlanta, Georgia, United States
Monarch Beverage, Inc., a drinks distributor in Indianapolis, Indiana, United States
Monarch, a paper size
Monarch High School (disambiguation), several schools

See also
Monarcha, a genus of bird in the Monarchinae subfamily
Monach Islands, an uninhabited island group off the west coast of Scotland
Monark, a Swedish bicycle
Restaurant Monarh, a Dutch restaurant
List of current monarchs